Sairusi Sainitiki Waitawa Nalaubu (born 14 December 1996) is a Fijian footballer who plays as a striker for Fiji Premier League club Lautoka and the Fiji national team.

Club career
Nalaubu, playing for Suva F.C., was the golden boot winner for the 2020 Fiji Premier League and the 2020 FF Cup.

International career
Nalaubu made his international debut for the Fiji national team on 10 March 2022 by scoring a hat-trick in a 3–0 friendly win against Vanuatu.

On 18 March 2022, Nalaubu scored a brace in a 2–1 victory against New Caledonia in a  2022 FIFA World Cup qualification.

Career statistics

Scores and results list Fiji's goal tally first, score column indicates score after each Nalaubu goal.

Honours
Suva F.C.
Fiji Premier League: 2020

Lautoka F.C.
Fiji Premier League: 2021

Individual
Fiji Premier League Golden Boot: 2020
Fiji Premier League Golden Boot: 2021

References

External links
 
 Sairusi Nalaubu at Oceania Football Center

1996 births
Living people
Fijian footballers
Association football forwards
Fiji international footballers
Lautoka F.C. players